Hungry Hands is the third studio album by American metalcore band American Standards, released on May 30, 2014.

Release 
"Casket Party" was the first single released with an accompanying music video on May 23, 2014.

KeepItFast.com wrote of Hungry Hands "What sets Arizona’s American Standards apart from their hardcore contemporaries is their inventiveness and balls to mix things up rather than sticking to a familiar path. At only three tracks long, Hungry Hands is a brief  but chaotic bruising of blunt, passionate hardcore."

Track listing

Personnel 
Writing, performance and production credits are adapted from the album liner notes.

American Standards 
 Brandon Kellum – vocals
 Corey Skowronski – guitar
 Steven Mandell – bass
 Mike Cook – drums

Production 
 American Standards – production, mixing
 Andy Marshall – engineering
 Brad Boatright – mastering at Audiosiege, Portland, OR

Design
 Corey Skowronski – art, design

References

External links 
 American Standards on Youtube
 American Standards on Bandcamp

2014 albums
American Standards albums